Antonio Pérez (born 10 October 1956) is a Cuban volleyball player. He competed in the men's tournament at the 1980 Summer Olympics.

References

External links
 

1956 births
Living people
Cuban men's volleyball players
Olympic volleyball players of Cuba
Volleyball players at the 1980 Summer Olympics
Place of birth missing (living people)
Pan American Games medalists in volleyball
Pan American Games gold medalists for Cuba
Pan American Games silver medalists for Cuba
Medalists at the 1979 Pan American Games
Medalists at the 1983 Pan American Games